A lawn jockey is a statue depicting a man in jockey clothes, intended to be placed in front yards as hitching posts, similar to those of footmen bearing lanterns near entrances and gnomes in gardens. The lawn ornament, popular in certain parts of the United States and Canada in years past, was a cast replica, usually about half-scale or smaller, generally of a man dressed in jockey's clothing and holding up one hand as though taking the reins of a horse. The hand sometimes carries a metal ring (suitable for hitching a horse in the case of solid concrete or iron versions) and, in some cases, a lantern, which may or may not be operational.

Originally a welcoming symbol to guests and providing to those on horseback a practical and novel hitching post, later statues eventually became only decorative and not well suited for hitching a horse, often favored by those wishing to evoke an Old South or equestrian ambiance.

Historically, black jockeys depicting racist caricatures of African Americans were commonplace. Several styles have been produced, with the most prolific being a shorter version commonly known as "Jocko" and a taller version known as "cavalier spirit". The former is of stockier build, with a hunched posture; the latter generally is more slender. Typically these statues are made of concrete, but also are made of other materials such as iron, and may be found in polyresin and aluminum. The item has a history rooted in racism and slavery, and the original racial cariactures it employed are no longer in use.

Characteristics

Jocko
The earlier "Jocko" design usually depicts the right arm raised, and was styled as a racist caricature of a young black boy, often with exaggerated features, such as big eyes with the whites painted in; large lips painted red; a large, flat nose and curly hair. Typically, these pieces were painted in gaudy colors for the uniform as with racing colors, with the flesh of the statue a gloss black. As of the 20th century, these statues have been considered racist, and many remaining samples have now been repainted, using pink paint for the skin while the original sculpture's exaggerated features remain.

Cavalier spirit

The "cavalier spirit" design usually depicts the left arm raised and uses the likeness of a Caucasian young man, lacking the minstrelsy features of its Jocko counterpart . These statues would also be painted in stark colors, with skin in either gloss black or pastel pink, red lips, etc., white breeches, black boots, and usually with the vest and cap of either bright red or dark green. Occasionally, the vest and cap might be painted in the bright shades of a jockey's racing silks. Several of the "cavalier spirit" jockey statues are prominently displayed at both the entrance of the 21 Club in Manhattan and the entrance of the Santa Anita Park clubhouse in Los Angeles.

A 1947 magazine advertisement uses two images of cavalier-style lawn jockeys to underscore the statue's use as a symbol of the hospitality associated with Old Taylor Kentucky Bourbon, stating: "Jockey hitching posts that invited guests to tarry are an old Kentucky tradition – another sign of a good host."

Background

Underground Railroad communication tool
Charles L. Blockson, Curator Emeritus of the Afro-American Collection at Temple University in Philadelphia and author of Hippocrene Guide to the Underground Railroad, claims the figures were used in the days of the Underground Railroad to guide escaping slaves to freedom: "Green ribbons were tied to the arms of the statue to indicate safety; red ribbons meant to keep going ...".

Patterns and markings on the clothing also are said to have indicated messages understood by fleeing slaves.

However, these claims of an association with the Underground Railroad have not been corroborated by historians. The Jim Crow Museum of Racist Memorabilia also notes that "there is very little, if any, primary source material for the claim that lawn jockeys were used as signaling devices for escaping slaves on the Underground Railroad."

Revolutionary War origin legend
An apocryphal account of the figure's origin portrays the statue as representing a hero of African American history and culture. According to the River Road African American Museum, the figure originated in commemoration of heroic dedication to duty: "It is said that the 'lawn jockey' has its roots in the tale of one Jocko Graves, an African-American youth who served with General George Washington at the time that he crossed the Delaware to carry out his surprise attack on Hessian forces at Trenton, NJ. The General thought him too young to take along on such a dangerous attack, so he left him on the Pennsylvania side to tend to the horses and to keep a light on the bank for their return. So the story goes, the boy, faithful to his post and his orders, froze to death on the river bank during the night, the lantern still in his hand. The General was so much moved by the boy's devotion to his duty that he had a statue sculpted and cast of him, holding the lantern, and had it installed at his Mount Vernon estate. He called the sculpture "The Faithful Groomsman"."

The most frequently cited source for the story is Kenneth W. Goings in "Mammy and Uncle Mose" (Indiana University Press, 1994), though he regards it as legend. The story was also laid out in a 32-page children's book by Earl Kroger Sr., "Jocko: A Legend of the American Revolution" (1963). There is also a 13-page typescript titled "A Horse for the General: The Story of Jocko Graves" (1972), by Thomas William Halligan, in the archives of the University of Alaska Anchorage / Alaska Pacific University Consortium Library.

The Revolutionary War legend is not corroborated by historical records. Mount Vernon's librarian Ellen McCallister Clark wrote in a 1987 letter to Baltimore's Enoch Pratt Free Library: "No record of anybody by the name of Jocko Graves, nor any account of somebody freezing to death holding Washington's horses, exists in the extensive historical record of the time."

In popular culture 
In media and popular culture, lawn jockeys sometimes appear as a prop or conversation piece, in most cases merely trivial and non-notable in nature, although notable racial connotations are often associated with earlier examples of lawn jockeys versus more modern contemporary examples. Sometimes a reference to a lawn jockey is used to illustrate a racist or race-based point in popular culture. For example, in a Season 1 episode of The Golden Girls, Sophia makes a subtle hint at Blanche's southern American roots being steeped in racism, suggesting to the woman that she "tar and feather the neighbour's lawn jockey" in order to make her father feel at home during his visit to the more liberal city of Miami, Florida. In All in the Family, the gift of a black lawn jockey is bestowed to main character Archie Bunker to annoy him, owing to his reputed racial bigotry, although in an unexpected twist, Archie actually finds the racist gift inappropriate and bothersome, refusing to put it out on his own property. In Season 1, episode 13 of Maude, Arthur refers to a black man protesting slumlords on Maude's front lawn as "so much more animated than those little black jockeys".

Lawn jockeys are often associated with wealthy white American families in popular culture, either for satire and sociopolitical symbolism, or for legitimate aesthetic appeal. Examples of this trend include, but are not limited to, the following:

Raymond Chandler's Philip Marlowe 1942 novel The High Window features a lawn jockey decorating the Pasadena home of Marlowe's clients, the wealthy but dysfunctional Murdock family. Marlowe sardonically speaks to the statue several times, regarding it as the family's stablest member.
A black lawn jockey plays a symbolic role (as well as providing the story's title, in the protagonist's southern vernacular) in Flannery O'Connor 's 1955 short story "The Artificial Nigger".
A lawn jockey comes to life Stephen King's 2008 novel Duma Key.
The Negro (Le nèg'), a 2002 film by Québécois director Robert Morin, about a black adolescent who resents lawn jockeys as racist and destroys one, resulting in his murder.
A lawn jockey and images of lawn jockeys appear in several episodes of Dear White People. 
A lawn jockey was seen in Home Alone getting knocked over three times by cars.
A lawn jockey that comes alive is one of the enemies found in the video game Paperboy.
Lawn jockeys are often referenced in relation to Blanche Devereaux's southern family in The Golden Girls, often as a subtle implication that Blanche's family (who lived on a plantation and historically owned slaves) are racist. Despite this, Blanche is not racist herself, nor are her children or her father, "Big Daddy" Hollingsworth. It is said at one point that Big Daddy's father, Grandpappy Hollingsworth of Alabama, would get drunk and order a black lawn jockey on the property to "do a little dance".
The central character in Frank Zappa's song "Uncle Remus" is a student protester who vows to visit Beverly Hills in the night and "knock the lawn jockeys off the rich people's lawn, And before they get up I'll be gone, I'll be gone".

Gallery

See also
Blackamoor
Concrete Aboriginal
Garden gnome
Jew with a coin
Cigar store Indian
Representation of African Americans in media
Stereotypes of African Americans

References

External links

 Signals of the Underground Railroad
 Article debunking story of lawn jockeys
 Newspaper article about the children's book author who wrote about the origin of lawn jockeys
 The Secret Life of the Black Lawn Jockey

Garden ornaments
Outdoor sculptures
Landscape design history of the United States
Culture of the Southern United States
Black people in art
Stereotypes of African Americans
Stereotypes of black people
Underground Railroad